Gun Carlson (born 17 August 1939) is a politician in Åland, an autonomous and unilingually Swedish territory of Finland.

 Member of the Lagting (Parliament of Åland) 2003-2011 
 Minister of education and culture 1999-2003 
Minister of social affairs and environment 1995-1999
Substitute member of government 1994-1995

References

1939 births
Living people
Politicians from Åland